Dome Mountain, elevation , is a mountain peak in the southern section of the Gallatin Range in Yellowstone National Park, in the U.S. state of Wyoming.

Climate 

According to the Köppen climate classification system, Dome Mountain has an alpine subarctic climate with long, cold, snowy winters, and cool to mild summers. Winter temperatures can drop below −10 °F with wind chill factors below −30 °F.

See also
 Mountains and mountain ranges of Yellowstone National Park

Notes

Mountains of Wyoming
Mountains of Yellowstone National Park
Mountains of Park County, Wyoming